Silvia Serafina Sardone (born 25 December 1982 in Milan) is an Italian politician and a Member of the European Parliament since 2019.

Biography

She graduated in Law at Bocconi University in 2007; subsequently she won a scholarship for the research doctorate of the international school in labor relations at the University of Modena and Reggio Emilia (Marco Biagi University Foundation). She got a master's degree in Business administration at the Polytechnic University of Milan.

She deals with labor law and industrial relations, with particular attention to the issue of labor relations.

From 2010 to 2014 she was first a

board member and then the president of Afol (Agency for training and career guidance) of the Province of Milan.

In 2006 she was elected, as member of Forza Italia, to the Council of Zone 2 of Milan, where she remained for 10 years. In 2016 she was a candidate for the Milan City Council, where she was elected with 2,336 preference votes.

In 2018 she was a candidate for the Regional Council of Lombardy and was elected with 11,312 preference votes. In the summer of 2018 she decided to leave Forza Italia, declaring that she no longer recognized herself in the policies carried out by the party at national level and joined the Mixed Group, both in the Municipality and in the Region.

In 2019 she was candidate for MEP on the League list and she has been elected with about 45,000 preferences.

Personal life
She has 2 children and is married to the mayor of Sesto San Giovanni Roberto Di Stefano.

References

1982 births
Living people
MEPs for Italy 2019–2024
21st-century women MEPs for Italy
Lega Nord MEPs
Forza Italia (2013) politicians
Politicians from Milan
Bocconi University alumni